Amato is a comune and town in the province of Catanzaro in the Calabria region of Italy.

Amato may also refer to:

 Amato (surname)
 Amato (racehorse), winner of the 1838 Derby Stakes
 Amato Lusitano (1511-1568), Portuguese Jewish physician
 Amato Opera, an American opera company

See also
 Amati
 Amato's
 D'Amato